Suillus ponderosus is a species of bolete fungus in the family Suillaceae. It was first described scientifically by American mycologists Alexander H. Smith and Harry D. Thiers in 1964.

See also
List of North American boletes

References

External links

ponderosus
Fungi described in 1964
Fungi of North America
Taxa named by Harry Delbert Thiers
Taxa named by Alexander H. Smith